A Water pyramid or WaterPyramid is a village-scale solar still, designed to distill water using solar energy for remote communities without easy access to clean, fresh water. It provides a means whereby communities can produce potable drinking water from saline, brackish or polluted water sources.

History 
Martijn Nitzsche, an engineer from the Netherlands, founded Aqua-Aero Water Systems to develop water treatment and purification systems. In the early 2000s, the company invented the WaterPyramid technology. The first WaterPyramid was engineered and installed in collaboration with MWH Global, an international environmental engineering firm, in the country of Gambia in 2005. The WaterPyramid desalination systems were awarded the World Bank Development Marketplace award in 2006.

Description 
It is constructed of plastic sheeting, which is inflated using a fan powered by solar energy generated by the pyramid. Distilled water runs down the sides of the pyramid wall and is collected by gutters that feed into a collection tank. When sunshine is replaced by rain, the falling water is also collected around the edge of the base of the cone and stored for use in dry weather. Each pyramid can desalinate approximately 265 gallons (1000 liters) of water each day. To increase water production, a village simply adds additional pyramids.

Operation of each pyramid is the responsibility of the local community, generating employment opportunities for the village. Since the water produced by the Pyramid is distilled water, there are also business uses for excess water production, such as the filling of batteries, which provide additional income to the village.

See also 
Desalination
Solar-powered desalination unit
Solar still
Seawater Greenhouse

Notes

External links 
 Inventor of the WaterPyramid, Aqua-Aero Water Systems: www.aaws.nl
 Collaborative engineering and consulting firm MWH: mwhglobal.com

Water treatment
Water technology
Water supply
Hydrology
Appropriate technology
Drinking water
Water and the environment